Wang Feng (1910–1998), original surname Wang, was a People's Republic of China politician, born in Shaanxi Province. He was Chinese Communist Party Committee Secretary of Gansu, twice Chinese Communist Party Committee Secretary of Ningxia and Chinese Communist Party Committee Secretary and Chairmen of Xinjiang (1978).

1910 births
1998 deaths
People's Republic of China politicians from Shaanxi
Chinese Communist Party politicians from Shaanxi
Political office-holders in Gansu
Political office-holders in Ningxia
Political office-holders in Xinjiang
Vice Chairpersons of the National Committee of the Chinese People's Political Consultative Conference